is a Japanese children's manga written and illustrated by  (村瀬範行 Murase Noriyuki). It has been serialized in Monthly CoroCoro Comic from June 2004.

The series is about a white eraser who becomes Keshikasu-kun by putting an eraser crumb on his head and a paper costume on his body. Keshikasu-kun wants to become the best of the stationery supplies, outdoing other characters such as the blackboard eraser (kokuban-keshi) and the correction fluid (shūseieki).

Beginning in 2008 Keshikasu-kun appeared in the television program  (おはコロシアム). Keshikasu-kun received the Shogakukan Manga Award in the children's category in 2008.

The January 2010 issue of Monthly Coro Coro Comic, released on December 15, 2009, revealed that an anime adaptation, classified by Shogakukan-Shueisha Productions as a television program, had been approved.

The anime aired for 44 episodes from 2010 to 2013.

A videogame called Keshikasu-kun Battle Kastival was released by Konami in 2010.

Characters
 Keshikasu (ケシカス) - The white eraser
 Bōzu (ボウズ) - The student boy who is the owner of Keshikasu
 Enpitsu (エンピツ) - The pencil
 Chibikasu (チビカス) - The white eraser who is Keshikasu's young brother
 Shūseieki (修正液) - The correction fluid
 Kokuban Keshi (黒板消し) - The blackboard eraser

References

External links
  Keshikasu-kun - Cartoon Network Japan 
  Keshikasu-kun - ShoPro

Children's manga
Shogakukan franchises
Shogakukan manga
Winners of the Shogakukan Manga Award for children's manga
2004 manga
Shōnen manga